is a railway station on the Ban'etsu West Line in the city of Kitakata, Fukushima Prefecture,  Japan, operated by East Japan Railway Company (JR East).

Lines

Station layout
Aizu-Toyokawa Station has one side platform serving a single bi-directional track. The station is unattended.

History
Aizu-Toyokawa Station opened on November 1, 1934. The station was closed for a one-year period from June 10, 1945, to June 10, 1946. The station was absorbed into the JR East network upon the privatization of the Japanese National Railways (JNR) on April 1, 1987.

Surrounding area
 Kitakata Prefectural Too High School
 Kitakata City Toyokawa Elementary School

See also
 List of railway stations in Japan

External links

 JR East Station information 

Railway stations in Fukushima Prefecture
Ban'etsu West Line
Railway stations in Japan opened in 1934
Kitakata, Fukushima